Magal may refer to:

People
Magal (footballer, born 1980), Sidnei da Silva, Brazilian right back
Magal (footballer, born 1987), Magno Aparecido de Andrade, Brazilian left back
Abba Magal (c. 1800), king of Gibe, leader of the Diggo Oromo
Aditya Magal (born 1985), Indian author and blogger
Ivan Magal or Mahal (born 1990), Belarusian footballer
Jiří Magál (born 1977), Czech cross-country skier
Ruslan Magal (born 1991), Russian footballer
Sidney Magal (born 1950), stage name Sidney Magalhães, Brazilian singer, dancer and actor

Other uses
Magal (kibbutz), a community in Haifa, Israel
Magal (TV series), a 2007 Indian Tamil-language morning soap opera 
Magal (song), a sung celebration in Nepal
Magal, a variant of the IMI Galil automatic rifle

See also
Grand Magal of Touba, a Senegalese pilgrimage